{{Infobox deity
| type         = Yoruba
| other_names  = Ọ̀sanyìn or Osanyin; Osaín or Ossain; and Ossaím| member_of    = Orisha
| venerated_in = Yoruba religion, Umbanda, Candomble, Santeria, Haitian Vodou, Folk Catholicism
| image        = 
| caption      = 
| deity_of     = Plants, Healing, Magic, whispering
| color        = 
| region       = Nigeria, Benin, Latin America
| ethnic_group = Yoruba
| symbol       = ase| siblings     = Orunmila}}Ọsanyin (Yoruba: Ọ̀sanyìn, rendered Osaín/Ossain/Ossaím''' in Latin America) is the one-eyed, one-armed, one-legged orisha of healing herbs. In America he is syncretized with Saint Joseph.

References

Yoruba gods
Health gods
Santería
Candomblé